The Susquehanna Pfaltzgraff Company was a conglomerate of companies that started in the 19th century with Johann George Pfaltzgraff's emigration from Germany to York, Pennsylvania (in the Susquehanna Valley). 

Johann Pfaltzgraff was a potter and, after he died in the late 19th century, his children carried on his pottery making business and started The Pfaltzgraff Company, a kitchenware company, in 1889.

Susquehanna Broadcasting Company was founded in 1941 to apply for and operate a radio station in York, Pennsylvania, by Louis J. Appell, president and treasurer of Pfaltzgraff.  The Federal Communications Commission issued a construction permit for the station, which would become WSBA, on December 30, 1941.

Important Events 

 In 1965, Susquehanna Communications (SusCom) was founded as a division of Susquehanna Broadcasting but changed its name in 1999, reflecting its change from a provider of traditional cable television to a provider of a variety of advanced, interactive, digital communications products.
 In December 1981, Susquehanna Real Estate was formed.
 In 1993, Susquehanna Media Company (SMC) was formed, of which Susquehanna Communications was a subsidiary (but, as of 2007, is owned by Comcast). Susquehanna Radio, another subsidiary, was bought by Cumulus Media Partners on May 5, 2006. Susquehanna Radio owned and operated 33 AM and FM stations nationwide at its peak, including WSBA AM in York, PA.
 BlazeNet was founded in 1996 to provide dial-up and cable modem access in central Pennsylvania.
 Susquehanna Technologies (SusQtech) became its own entity in November 2001.
 Susquehanna Pfaltzgraff Co. was sold in May 2006.

See also
 Susquehanna Communications
 Susquehanna Radio
 The Pfaltzgraff Company

References

External links
 Suspfz.com: Official Susquehanna Pfaltzgraff website — corporate overview.
 Susqtech.com website

Conglomerate companies of the United States
Defunct companies based in Pennsylvania
Companies based in York County, Pennsylvania
York, Pennsylvania

Manufacturing companies established in 1811
Manufacturing companies disestablished in 2006
Technology companies disestablished in 2006
1811 establishments in Pennsylvania
2006 disestablishments in Pennsylvania